Hairi Su'ap (born in Singapore) is a Singaporean football manager who now works as head coach of Tanjong Pagar United in his home country.

Career

Su'ap started his managerial career with Yishun Sentek Mariners. In 2020, he was appointed head coach of Tanjong Pagar United in the Singapore Premier League, a position he still holds.

References

External links
 Baptism of fire for Tanjong Pagar United coach Hairi Su'ap

Living people
Singaporean football managers
Tanjong Pagar United FC head coaches
Year of birth missing (living people)